William Brown (17 September 1928 – January 2017) was a Scottish professional footballer who played as a centre forward in the Scottish League and in the English Football League. He was born and died in Forfar.

References

Sources
 

1928 births
2017 deaths
People from Forfar
Scottish footballers
Forfar Athletic F.C. players
Accrington Stanley F.C. (1891) players
Nelson F.C. players
English Football League players
Scottish Football League players
Association football forwards
Footballers from Angus, Scotland